Dowlatshahi (also Romanized as Dowlatshāhī and Daulat Shāh) is a village in Dehpir Rural District, in the Central District of Khorramabad County, Lorestan Province, Iran. At the 2006 census, its population was 296, in 64 families.

References 

Towns and villages in Khorramabad County